Abbasabad Poshteh (also known as ‘Abbāsābād) is a village in Japelaq-e Gharbi Rural District, Japelaq District, Azna County, Lorestan Province, Iran. At the 2006 census, its population was 25, in 6 families.

References 

Towns and villages in Azna County